Sopot Hit Festival - is an international song contest, bringing contestants and guests who are stars with world recognition. It has been transmitted annually by the Polish Television in the coastal resort of Sopot, Poland. Together with National Festival of Polish Song in Opole and Sopot Festival it the biggest Polish music festival.

Polish Hit Summer 2008 - August 8 

 Quarter-finals

 Semi-finals
 Ewelina Flinta i Łukasz Zagrobelny - Nie kłam, że kochasz mnie - 34,6%
 Doda - Nie Daj Się - 34,5%
 Ich Troje - We play in the team - 30,9%

 Final
Ewelina Flinta i Łukasz Zagrobelny - Nie kłam, że kochasz mnie (25,5%)
Doda - Nie Daj Się - Polish Hit Summer 2008 (45,1%)
Ich Troje - We play in the team (29,4%)

Stars: Kate Ryan, Monrose, Arash.

International Hit Summer 2008 - August 9 

 Quarter-finals

 Semi-finals
Shaun Baker feat. MaLoY - Hey Hi Hello (43,7%)
Alex C. feat Y-ass - Du hast den schönsten Arsch der Welt (34,7%)
Nexx - Synchronize Lips (21,6%)

Final
Shaun Baker feat. MaLoY - Hey Hi Hello - International Hit Summer 2008 (55,2%)
Alex C. feat Y-ass - Du hast den schönsten Arsch der Welt (29,7%)
Nexx - Synchronize Lips (15,1%)

Stars: Stachursky, Patrycja Markowska, Feel.

External links 
 Sopot Hit Festival 2008 website

Sopot
Music festivals in Poland
Music competitions in Poland
Song contests
Singing competitions
Tourist attractions in Pomeranian Voivodeship